
Year 733 (DCCXXXIII) was a common year starting on Thursday (link will display the full calendar) of the Julian calendar. The denomination 733 for this year has been used since the early medieval period, when the Anno Domini calendar era became the prevalent method in Europe for naming years.

Events 
 By place 

 Byzantine Empire 
 Emperor Leo III confiscates the papal territories in Sicily and Calabria (Southern Italy), from which Pope Gregory III derives most of his income tax. He transfers ecclesiastical jurisdiction in the former Praetorian prefecture of Illyricum to Anastasius, patriarch of Constantinople. Gregory begins his support of a revolt in Italy against iconoclasm. By now the break between the papacy and the Byzantine Empire is almost complete.
Arab-Byzantine Wars: Arab forces under Mu’awiya ibn Hisham penetrate deep into Anatolia and conquer the cities of Antalya, Doralyum and Afyonkarahisar. These conquests differ from previous ones, as Arab military settling occurs in them, making them a base to raid Byzantium.

 Europe 
 Duke Eudes of Aquitaine, aged almost 80, abdicates and retires to a monastery. His lands are divided between his sons Hunald I and Hatton, who continue the conflict with Charles Martel, mayor of the palace of Neustria and Austrasia. In battles at Benest in Charente and La Rochefoucauld (near Angoulême), Charles probably defeats the Aquitainians. He also campaigns against the Burgundians.
 Umayyad conquest of Hispania: Muslim forces under Abd al-Malik ibn Katan al-Fihri, governor (wali) of Al-Andalus, cross the Pyrenees and ravage both sides of the mountains. He establishes colonies along the Ebro Valley, and within Basque territory. The Moorish main military efforts are in Catalonia, Aragon, Navarre and Septimania (Southern France), strengthening the towns already in their hands.
 Duke Audelais of Benevento and his minor son Gisulf are deposed by King Liutprand of the Lombards. He is succeeded by Gregory, who becomes ruler of Benevento.

Births 
 Donnchad Midi, High King of Ireland (d. 797)
 Junnin, emperor of Japan (d. 765)
 Lu Yu, Chinese author (d. 804)

Deaths 
 Eochaid mac Echdach, king of Dál Riata (modern Scotland)
 Li Yuanhong, chancellor of the Tang Dynasty
 Mildrith, Anglo-Saxon abbess (approximate date)
 Muhammad al-Baqir, fifth Shia imam and descendant of Prophet Muhammad
 Yamanoue no Okura, Japanese poet (approximate date)

References